The Big Circus is a 1959 film starring Victor Mature as a circus owner struggling with financial trouble and a murderous unknown saboteur. It was produced and cowritten by Irwin Allen, later known for a series of big-budget disaster films.

Plot
After splitting from his partnership with the Borman Brothers, Hank Whirling needs money to keep his Whirling Circus operational now that it must compete with the Bormans. He receives a bank loan but only on the condition he take along accountant Randy Sherman and publicist Helen Harrison to help the circus turn a profit.

Hank's top act is the Colino trapeze troupe, featuring Zach Colino, his wife Maria and newcomer Tommy Gordon. The circus also features ringmaster Hans and clown Skeeter. Unknown to Hank, his sister Jeannie wishes to be a trapeze artist and has been secretly training with the Colino act.

At a press party, a lion is let loose, terrifying the VIPs in attendance until Hank captures it with the help of Colino. Helen accuses him of staging the incident for publicity. They soon discover that the cage had been deliberately opened by an animal trainer named Slade, who is found, captured and eventually jailed.

When Skeeter is drunk and unable to perform his act, Randy substitutes, making numerous mistakes that actually made the act funnier.

Helen and Randy are infuriated by Whirling's refusal to accept their help. Hank believes that he is a good publicist and does not need Helen. After Randy fires 40 roustabouts and replaces them with a machine for raising the tent, Hank argues with him. The machine is sabotaged and sets a pile of hay on fire, but Hank prevents the tent from burning. Hank, Helen and Randy wonder if a saboteur, perhaps hired by the Bormans, is among the crew.

When the first section of the circus train derails, Maria Colino is killed, leaving her husband heartbroken and unable to perform. Attendance suffers because of recent foul weather, and the books are looking grim with the headline act unavailable.

Hank conceives a bold scheme. He will scrap the existing route, perform one show in Buffalo, and then slip into New York City three weeks before the Bormans' circus, stealing the audience from his rival. But he must create a major publicity splash. Helen proposes a stunt last performed in the 19th century: a walk across the gorge at Niagara Falls on a tightrope. As Zach has lost his confidence after his wife's death, Hank goads him into performing the stunt by calling him a coward. Zach plans to kill Hank after walking the tightrope, but after completing the walk, Zach realizes that Hank had been trying to help him and they reconcile.

With the bank about to foreclose on his circus, Hank approaches television star Steve Allen to seek publicity. Allen purchases the rights to broadcast the opening-night performance in New York for enough money to pay the show's line of credit and enable it to survive. Detectives come looking for Tommy and inform the show's management that he is an escaped lunatic. Hank realizes that Tommy is the saboteur.

Jeannie's debut with the Colino act nearly ends in disaster when Tommy deliberately misses catching her, but she manages to grasp a rope. While fleeing from Zach, Tommy falls to his death.

With the circus now profitable and the saboteur dead, Hank and Helen realize that they are in love. They kiss passionately.

Cast

 Victor Mature as Henry Jasper "Hank" Whirling
 Red Buttons as Randy Sherman
 Rhonda Fleming as Helen Harrison
 Kathryn Grant as Jeannie Whirling
 Vincent Price as Hans Hagenfeld
 Gilbert Roland as Zach Colino
 Peter Lorre as Skeeter
 David Nelson as Tommy Gordon
 Adele Mara as Maria 'Mama' Colino
 Howard McNear as Mr. Lomax
 Charles Watts as Jonathan Nelson
 Steve Allen as himself (cameo)

Production
Irwin Allen announced the film in 1957. He intended to produce and direct the film for Columbia and planned to have parts for 40 stars, in a similar manner to how he had produced and directed The Story of Mankind. The project would eventually be undertaken by Allied Artists.

Filming began in January 1959 at the MGM studios. Allen was interested in making "an exciting colorful show—something the public can't see on television."

Famed circus performer Barbette served on the film as a consultant.

Reception
According to Kinematograph Weekly the film performed "better than average" at the British box office in 1959.

Comic book adaptation
A comic book adaptation of the film, Dell Four Color #1036, was released in August 1959.

See also
 List of American films of 1959
 The Greatest Show on Earth - 1952 Academy Award for Best Picture winner similar in content

References

External links
 
 
 
 
 
 The Big Circus at TV Guide

1959 films
1959 drama films
Allied Artists films
American drama films
Circus films
CinemaScope films
1950s English-language films
Films produced by Irwin Allen
Films directed by Joseph M. Newman
Films adapted into comics
Films with screenplays by Irving Wallace
Films scored by Paul Sawtell
1950s American films